Nuitrematidae is a monotypic family of trematodes in the order Plagiorchiida. It consists of one genus, Nuitrema Kurochkin, 1975, which consists of one species, Nuitrema strigeiforme Kurochkin, 1975.

References

Plagiorchiida
Trematode families